Lukanga may refer to:

Lukanga Swamp, a major wetland in Zambia
Lokanga bara, a type of fiddle native to Madagascar
Lukanga (name), a first name in parts of Central Africa